Kenneth Tomlins (born 2 January 1938) is a Hong Kong sailor. He competed in the Tempest event at the 1972 Summer Olympics.

References

External links
 

1938 births
Living people
Hong Kong male sailors (sport)
Olympic sailors of Hong Kong
Sailors at the 1972 Summer Olympics – Tempest
Place of birth missing (living people)